"Masakali" is a Hindi song from the 2009 Bollywood film Delhi-6. It was composed by A. R. Rahman, sung by Mohit Chauhan and lyrics penned by Prasoon Joshi. The song was released as part of the soundtrack album of the film on 14 January 2009 at the Indian Idol 4 competition. This song is remade as Masakali 2.0
sung by Sachet Tandon and Tulsi Kumar from the movie Marjaavaan.

Development
Rahman composed the song much before he swept nearly all the international music awards for his Slumdog Millionaire soundtrack. He recorded the song in December 2008 and the vocalist was collaborating with Rahman only for the second time. The title of the song was the name of a pigeon appearing in the movie. The pigeon was a major theme used in the movie.

Release
The song was released as part of the soundtrack album of the film on 14 January 2009 at the Indian Idol 4 competition. The first video of the song "Masakali" was released featuring Sonam Kapoor and Abhishek Bachchan with a pigeon. However, the song was not part of the original film. According to the director, "The song was not really meant to be part of the narrative. I mean, who would think of putting in a song about a dove in a film like Delhi-6? It just happened. When I came to the pre-climax portion of my script, I was stuck. I needed a continuity link taking the narrative to its finale".

Reception

Chart performance
The song got excellent responses and soon became the chart topper of the year. It ranked #2 in the 2009 top songs list of The Times of India. They commented on the song, "
This expressive number from the film Delhi-6, sung by Mohit Chauhan, bowled people over. An AR Rahman composition, it's a free flowing, addictive, fun song. Masakalli is still being played on music channels and radio and it's expected to stay with music buffs for some time to come, owing to its joyful mood." The song topped the Indian charts for more than 34 continuous weeks and was declared as the most successful song of that year.

Awards
The song along with the soundtrack album, swept all the major music awards of the year. It emerged as the biggest winner in the Airtel Mirchi Music Awards - 2009 by winning the following categories.
 Best Song of the Year 
 Best Music Director of the Year - A. R. Rahman
 Best Male vocalist of the Year - Mohit Chauhan
 Best Lyricist of the Year - Prasoon Joshi
 Best Song Arranger and Programmer - A. R. Rahman

Criticism
In an interview about the lost literary elements of songs, ghazal singer Jagjit Singh dashed out against Prasoon Joshi for using the word "Masakali". He says, "Do you understand the meaning of "Jai Ho" or "Masakali"? I did not understand." (The former song is Academy Award-winning work by Rahman and noted poet Gulzar).

In popular culture
 A popular kurti style adapted the name of the song.
A remake, Masakali 2.0 which was recreated for 2019 film Marjaavaan, but was released on 8 April 2020 as an independent single, performed by Sachet Tandon and Tulsi Kumar and recomposed by Tanishk Bagchi.

References

2009 songs
Indian songs
Hindi film songs
Songs with music by A. R. Rahman
Songs with lyrics by Prasoon Joshi
Mohit Chauhan songs